Huffmanela branchialis is a parasitic nematode It has been observed on the gills of the fork-tailed threadfin bream Nemipterus furcosus, a nemipterid marine fish   off New Caledonia.  Its eggs are released from the gill mucosa with the turnover of living tissues and immediately continue their life-cycle.

Description

The adults are unknown, only the eggs were described. The eggs are 45–52 micrometers in length and 23–30 micrometers in width, with thin shells. Each egg is enclosed in a thin membrane forming a spindle-shaped envelope 53–85 micrometers in length.

See also 

Huffmanela filamentosa
Huffmanela lata
Huffmanela ossicola

References 

Enoplea
Parasitic nematodes of fish
Nematodes described in 2004